The World Wide Association Of Specialty Programs and Schools (WWASPS or WWASP) was an organization based in Utah, in the United States. WWASPS was founded by Robert Lichfield and was incorporated in 1998. WWASPS stated that it was an umbrella organization of independent institutions for education and treatment of troubled teenagers. Many outside observers believe, however, that the WWASPS-affiliated institutions were actually owned (through limited partnerships, many of which have used the same street address) by WWASPS or its principal officials or their close relatives. WWASPS is connected to several affiliated for-profit companies. These include Teen Help LLC, the marketing arm of WWASPS and the entity that processes admissions paperwork; Teen Escort Service, a teen escort company that transports teenagers to WWASPS facilities; R&B Billing, which does tuition billing and payment processing; and Premier Educational Systems, LLC (also called Premier Educational Seminars), which conducts orientation and training workshops for parents whose children are in WWASPS facilities. WWASPS claims to have "helped" over 10,000 students with issues related to personal behavior. Some participants and parents give positive reports of their experiences, but others say that WWASPS programs were abusive. WWASPS has faced widespread allegations of physical and psychological abuse of the teenagers sent into its programs, resulting in a lawsuit filed against the organization in 2006. WWASPS officials report that the organization is no longer in business, and the facilities originally under it no longer associate with the name, but because of ongoing litigation, it has not been dissolved.

Facilities
WWASPS operated, or was associated with, several facilities in the United States and in other countries. In 2003 there were 2,300 students enrolled in its facilities and programs. At one time, WWASPS facilities had tuition income of more than $90 million per year.

In July 2007 World Wide's president, Ken Kay, told the Salt Lake Tribune that only two schools remained in the WWASPS network, including Majestic Ranch Academy in Utah, which he said was likely to sever its ties with the organization. In a December 2010 newspaper article, Kay was reported to have said that the organization was no longer in business, but because of ongoing litigation, it had not been dissolved.

Schools and programs currently or formerly associated with the organization include the following:

Related and spinoff programs and projects
Some personnel formerly associated with WWASP schools and programs have gone on to establish or work at other similar institutions.

In 2005 Robert Lichfield and the Utah-based holding company, Golden Pond Investments Ltd., made an offer to buy the campus of the Kemper Military School in Boonville, Missouri, to open a new school for adolescents needing help with discipline, responsibility and leadership skills. It was announced that the school would be directed by former WWASP staff member Randall Hinton and his brother Russell Hinton. The Hintons told Boonville officials that the proposed school would not be a part of WWASP. The Boonville City Council rejected the proposal.

Randall Hinton later tried to resurrect the WWASP format with a similar "chain" of schools called Right Directions, but the effort never got past the planning stages. Most likely, this was meant to allow WWASP to retain many of its former properties under a new name with a clean slate, but ostensibly it would have been an entirely new entity.

Ken Kay is now superintendent of Browning Distance Learning Academy, a provider of homeschooling curriculum. Its materials were used by Mentor School in Costa Rica. As of 2022 no other school or homeschooling group has used Browning Distance Learning Academy, and it's assumed the company went bankrupt after Mentor's closure.

Controversy
WWASPS and its associated institutions have been the target of criticism over their treatment methods, including allegations of severe abuse and torture by staff at programs supported by WWASPS. The programs have been the subject of legal investigations by several U.S. states. In 2003, a reporter for The New York Times interviewed 60 current and former program participants and parents; some gave positive reports of their experiences, while other participants and parents said that WWASPS programs were abusive.

A WebWire report on October 16, 2006 stated that children housed in WWASP programs had to drink their own vomit, chain themselves to dog cages, starve, encounter emotional abuse and rape, consume rotten/spoiled food, and were denied the right to use a bathroom.

Numerous former students or their parents have filed lawsuits against WWASPS, its personnel, or individual schools. Most have been settled out of court or dismissed for procedural reasons. For example, a 2005 lawsuit filed in California on behalf of more than 20 plaintiffs was dismissed because the judge found that California lacked jurisdiction. In June 2007, Utah attorney Thomas M. Burton told a reporter that six suits he had filed against WWASPS on behalf of his clients had been dismissed on procedural grounds. WWASPS president Ken Kay told an interviewer that lawsuits against WWASPS are ploys to get money, brought by people who "are never going to be happy." A lawsuit filed in 2007 against WWASPS and its founder, Robert Lichfield, on behalf of 133 plaintiffs alleging physical and sexual abuse and fraudulent concealment of abuse brought negative publicity to Republican Presidential candidate Mitt Romney, because Lichfield was one of six co-chairs of the Utah state fundraising committee for Romney's campaign.

On several occasions, WWASPS and its principals have responded to criticism by suing their critics. Robert Lichfield sued two individuals associated with the International Survivors Action Committee (ISAC) for defamation, invasion of his privacy, and causing "intentional interference with 'prospective economic advantage'." That suit was pending as of April 2005. In May 2005 a U.S. Circuit Court of Appeals dismissed (on jurisdictional grounds) a defamation lawsuit brought by WWASPS against a United Press International reporter who had done research for a news story about alleged abuse at several WWASPS schools. The reporter was accused of having made defamatory statements about WWASPS to "potential students, former students, parents of potential and former students, an employee of a state agency responsible for licensing a member school, and a Utah attorney who had filed numerous suits against [WWASPS]."

On August 31, 2007, Randall Hinton was convicted of one count each of third degree assault and false imprisonment, for mistreating students at the WWASP-affiliated Royal Gorge Academy, of which he was manager and co-founder. However, the jury returned verdicts of "not guilty" on four other counts of third-degree assault and one other count of false imprisonment. Hinton was sentenced to jail followed by probation.

See also
Help at Any Cost: How the Troubled-teen Industry Cons Parents And Hurts Kids

References

Further reading
Cindy Art, Trapped in Paradise: A Memoir, CreateSpace, 2012. 
Claire and Mia Fontaine, Come Back: A Mother and Daughter's Journey Through Hell and Back, HarperCollins, 2006. 

Behavior modification
Child abuse-related organizations
Child care companies
Organizations established in 1998
Education companies of the United States
Educational organizations based in the United States
World Wide Association of Specialty Programs and Schools
Human rights abuses